Bitayin si... Baby Ama? is a 1976 Filipino film starring Rudy Fernandez and Alma Moreno, depicting the life of executed murderer and gang leader, Marciál "Baby" Ama. Ama, who became a gang leader with his own prison mob while serving a sentence for lesser charges, was executed for murder at the age of 16 via electric chair on October 4, 1961.

The film is credited with having launched Fernandez's career as an action star.

The film was followed by the sequel Anak ni Baby Ama (1990) starring Robin Padilla.

References

External links
 

1976 films
Filipino-language films
Films about capital punishment
Films set in 1961
Organized crime films based on actual events
Philippine biographical films
Tagalog-language films